Below are the rosters for the UEFA European Under-16 Football Championship 1996 tournament in Austria.

Group A

Head coach:

Head coach:  Edward Klejndinst

Head coach:

Head coach:

Group B

Head coach:

Head coach:

Head coach:

Head coach:

Group C

Head coach:  Martin Novoselac

Head coach:

Head coach:  Juan Santisteban

Head coach:

Group D

Head coach:

Head coach:
 Omer perez

Head coach:

Head coach:

Footnotes

UEFA European Under-17 Championship squads